Dead Men Ride is a 1971 Italian-Spanish Spaghetti Western film directed by Aldo Florio.

Cast

References

External links

Spaghetti Western films
1971 Western (genre) films
1971 films
Spanish Western (genre) films
Films scored by Bruno Nicolai
1970s Italian-language films
1970s Italian films